Palo Alto is a city in the San Francisco Bay Area of the United States.

Palo Alto may also refer to:

Places

United States
East Palo Alto, California, neighboring city to Palo Alto, California, United States
 Palo Alto County, Iowa, United States
 Palo Alto, Mississippi, United States
 Palo Alto, Pennsylvania, United States
 Palo Alto, Texas, United States
 Palo Alto, Virginia, an unincorporated community in Highland County, Virginia
Palo Alto, Louisiana, an unincorporated community in Ascension Parish, Louisiana

Mexico
 Palo Alto, Aguascalientes, Mexico

Media
 Palo Alto (2007 film)
 Palo Alto (2013 film)
 Palo Alto (book), a 2010 book of short stories by actor James Franco, named for his hometown in the Bay Area
 Palo Alto Records, founded in 1981
 "Palo Alto", a Radiohead song from the EP Airbag / How Am I Driving?
 "Palo Alto", a 2016 song by Jack River
 Paloalto (band), a Californian rock band
 Paloalto (album), their debut album
 Paloalto (rapper) (born Jeon Sang-hyun), a South Korean rapper and singer

Other
 El Palo Alto, a redwood tree in Palo Alto, California, and the city's namesake
 Palo Alto Research Center (formerly Xerox PARC)
 Palo Alto High School
 Palo Alto Internet Exchange (PAIX)
 Palo Alto Networks, a network security company based in Santa Clara, California.
 Palo Alto Unified School District
 Palo Alto Airport of Santa Clara County
 Palo Alto Daily News (local free newspaper)
 SS Palo Alto, a concrete ship
 Battle of Palo Alto, during the Mexican–American War

See also 
 Palo Alto Plantation (disambiguation)

 Palo Alto Networks